Milan Center is an unincorporated community in Milan Township, Allen County, in the U.S. state of Indiana.

History
Milan Center was named from Milan Township.

Geography

References

Unincorporated communities in Allen County, Indiana
Unincorporated communities in Indiana